Klingensmith is a surname. Notable people with the surname include:

John Klingensmith Jr. (1786–1854), American politician
Florence Klingensmith (1904–1933), American aviator